CQS may refer to:
 Command-query separation
 Consolidated Quotation System
 Color Quality Scale
 CQS (Asset Manager), managed by Michael Hintze